Josh Edwards may refer to:
 Josh Edwards (footballer, born 2000), Scottish defender for Dunfermline Athletic
 Josh Edwards (footballer, born 2004), English defender for Fleetwood Town
 Josh Edwards, known professionally as Blanco White, English singer-songwriter and guitarist